Sahawit Khumpiam (born 17 November 1994) is a Thai professional footballer who plays as a goalkeeper for Thai League 1 club Lamphun Warriors.

Personal life
Sahawit's father, Chaiyong Khumpiam, is a retired footballer who also played as a goalkeeper.

External links
 

1994 births
Living people
Sahawit Khumpiam
Sahawit Khumpiam
Association football goalkeepers
Sahawit Khumpiam
Sahawit Khumpiam
Sahawit Khumpiam
Sahawit Khumpiam
Sahawit Khumpiam